The 1989 Australian Indoor Championships was a men's tennis tournament played on indoor hard courts at the Sydney Entertainment Centre in Sydney, Australia and was part of the 1989 Nabisco Grand Prix. It was the 16th edition of the tournament and was held from 9 October through 15 October 1989. First-seeded Ivan Lendl won the singles title, his third at the event after 1985 and 1987.

Finals

Singles

 Ivan Lendl defeated  Lars-Anders Wahlgren 6–2, 6–2, 6–1
 It was Lendl's 9th singles title of the year and the 82nd of his career.

Doubles

 David Pate /  Scott Warner defeated  Darren Cahill /  Mark Kratzmann 6–3, 6–7, 7–5
 It was Pate's 2nd title of the year and the 11th of his career. It was Warner's only title of the year and the 1st of his career.

References

External links
 ITF – tournament edition details

 
Australian Indoor Championships
Ind
Sports competitions in Sydney
Tennis in New South Wales